Jimmy Herman (October 25, 1940 - September 13, 2013) was an Indigenous Canadian actor who appeared in several films, including Dances with Wolves.

Biography 
He was born on the Cold Lake Reserve in Alberta, Canada. His descents were Chipewyan and Dene. Herman moved to Edmonton in 1980 to study at Grant MacEwan College's Native Communications Program. There, he received the Malcolm Calliou Award for his ambition to succeed, and to inspire other Aboriginal people to do the same. After his graduation from Grant MacEwan, he accepted employment with Native Counseling Services of Alberta as a media assistant in the media department. During this time, he did some narration work for Native Counseling Services, ACCESS radio, and the National Film Board.

A small part in a CBC Television pilot program called John Cat, based on a W. P. Kinsella book, sparked Herman's interest in acting, and he decided to leave his position at Native Counseling Services to pursue a career in the performing arts. In April 1989, a Los Angeles casting agent chose him for a part in Dances With Wolves. His role in the film was a Sioux warrior named Stone Calf.

He went on to perform numerous roles in feature films and television series in Canada and the United States, including an extra in the Academy Award-winning Western, Unforgiven, the television film Crazy Horse The X-Files and a six-year stint on CBC's North of 60, portraying fur trapper Joe Gomba. In 2005, the Dreamspeakers Film Festival Society in Edmonton honoured him with a place on the Aboriginal Walk of Fame.

Herman spoke to Aboriginal youth in schools and at special events. He also turned towards political activism, seeking diplomatic solutions and bringing his voice to the debate surrounding Aboriginal treaty rights. Herman worked to better Treaty 6 communities.

Filmography

References

External links
 

1940 births
2013 deaths
Male actors from Alberta
First Nations male actors
MacEwan University alumni
Male Western (genre) film actors
Canadian male film actors
Indigenous actors